TAJBank Limited, is Nigeria's second Non-interest bank, operating under Islamic banking principles, established in Nigeria with its headquarters in Abuja, the capital city of the country.

The Bank operates 17 branches, 5 cash centers and provides regular ATM services as well as Online, Mobile, USSD (*898#) and SMS banking services.

History 
The institution was founded in 2019, as TAJBank Limited. On 3 July 2019, TAJBank received a license from the Central Bank of Nigeria, the national banking regulator, to operate as a regional bank. On 2 December 2019, the institution commenced business as TAJBank Limited in offices and branches in Abuja.

On 12 December 2019, TAJBank opened its second branch at Kano in the process of expanding to other urban centers in the Federal Republic of Nigeria. TAJBank recorded its early success in August 2022 culminating in the issuance of a National License by the Central Bank of Nigeria.

The Bank also opened a branch in Sokoto State on the 24th of August 2020. As a Non-Interest Bank with strategic intent of providing excellent services through technology and digital innovation, the Bank focuses on building a strong brand with solutions and competencies in non-interest banking while adopting sustainably ethical conventional banking products and services by leveraging on mainstream and digital media. 

In line with its mission and vision, the Bank seeks to redefine the banking landscape through continuous investment in cutting edge information technology with a view to delivering exceptional service to its teeming customers while also committing itself to its Core values which are Trust and Justice, Customer centricity, Excellence, Determination, and Innovation. 6 The strategic intent of the bank is to be recognized as the dominant non-interest bank operating in Nigeria with comprehensive non-interest banking products and achieve 75% market share as well as a market leader in service delivery ranking among the top 10 Banks in the country. As part of its strategic initiatives, the Bank also intends to pursue branch expansion to achieve at least (50) branches across state capitals/major commercial centres and e-channels (which includes agent banking) for the purpose of banking the unbanked populace and significantly promoting financial inclusion in Nigeria by 2025; while also eyeing international expansion in due course. In addition, TAJBank has continued to leverage the strengths of its business-savvy Board alongside its competent and experienced Management team and Staff which navigated the Bank to early success culminating in the issuance of a National License by the Central Bank of Nigeria in August 2022.

On February 14, 2023 TAJBank listed its N10billion Mudarabah Sukuk issuance at the Nigerian Exchange Limited (NGX)

Ownership

The Board of Directors of the bank are listed below.

Achievements 
Since the inception of the bank, here are a few notable achievements:

 Issuance of National Banking License by the Central Bank of Nigeria in August 2022.
 First Financial Institution to list Sukuk bond in the stock exchange in Africa.
 Pioneering role in issuing Nigeria's first corporate sukuk under a N100 Billion programme. The first tranche of N10 Billion was oversubscribed by 113% which culminates into N11.3Billion Naira. 
 Achievement of the Payment Card Industry Data Security Standard (PCI DSS) in its first year of operation.
 Achievements of ISO 27001, ISO 22303, and ISO 20000 certifications on Information security, Business continuity and IT Service Management systems respectively in its first year of operation.
  Recipient of the Businessday Islamic Bank of the Year 2022 by the Banks and other Financial Institutions Awards 2022 (BAFI) 
 Unflinching support for the growth of the Islamic Finance system in Africa.
 Signing of a Memorandum of Understanding (MOU) with the Islamic Corporation for the development of the Private sector (ICD), a member of the Islamic Development Bank (ISDB) group for growth and investment purposes in Africa.
  Driving Financial Inclusion through the deployment of a robust Agency banking network.
 Achievement of ''break-even'' in its 8th month of operation and N850 million in its first year of business as part of the financial performance of the Bank.

See also 
 Interest-free economy
 List of banks in Nigeria

References 

Banks of Nigeria
Abuja